The 1975 Little Mo Classic was a women's singles tennis tournament played on indoor carpet courts at the Omni Coliseum in Atlanta, Georgia in the United States. The event was part of the 1975 Women's International Grand Prixs. It was the inaugural edition of the tournament and was held from September 15 through September 21, 1975. First-seeded Chris Evert won the singles title and earned $15,000 first-prize money. The tournament was named after Maureen Connolly and held to benefit the tennis foundation in her name.

Finals

Singles
 Chris Evert defeated  Martina Navratilova 2–6, 6–2, 6–0
 It was Evert's 13th singles title of the year and the 52nd of her career.

Doubles
 Chris Evert /  Martina Navratilova  defeated  Françoise Dürr /  Betty Stöve 6–4, 5–7, 6–2

Prize money

See also
 Evert–Navratilova rivalry
 1975 Maureen Connolly Memorial

References

Little Mo Classic
Little Mo Classic
Little Mo Classic
Little Mo Classic